DAYS is FLOW's seventh single. Its A-Side was used as the first opening theme song for Eureka Seven. It reached number 3 on the Oricon charts in its first week and charted for 14 weeks.

Track listing

References

2005 singles
2005 songs
Flow (band) songs
Ki/oon Music singles
Anime songs